Fight Night 2004 is a 2004 boxing video game developed by NuFX, Inc. It features Roy Jones Jr. on the cover. It is the successor to EA's previous boxing series, Knockout Kings. Four sequels followed, Fight Night Round 2 in 2005, Fight Night Round 3 in 2006, Fight Night Round 4 in 2009 and Fight Night Champion in 2011. Its chief features are a career mode, in-depth and reasonably realistic fighting and an analog stick-based control scheme dubbed Total Punch Control, which was re-used, with enhancements, in the sequels.

Total Punch Control 
With Total Punch Control, most maneuvers, including punching, leaning and blocking, are performed with the left or right analog sticks, modified by the left or right triggers. For example, with the default controller configuration, moving the right analog stick up and to the left will cause the fighter to throw a straight punch with his left hand, while holding down the right trigger while performing the same movement and then holding R1 will cause the fighter to raise his guard to the left side of his head, ready to attempt a parry.

Reception 

Sales of Fight Night 2004 surpassed 1 million units worldwide by the end of June 2004. By July 2006, the PlayStation 2 version of Fight Night 2004 had sold 850,000 copies and earned $36 million in the United States. Next Generation ranked it as the 68th highest-selling game launched for the PlayStation 2, Xbox or GameCube between January 2000 and July 2006 in that country. Combined console sales of Fight Night games released in the 2000s reached 2.5 million units in the United States by July 2006.

Fight Night 2004 received "favorable" reviews on both platforms according to video game review aggregator Metacritic. GameSpot named it the best Xbox game of April 2004. It received a runner-up position in GameSpots 2004 "Best Traditional Sports Game" award category across all platforms, losing to ESPN NFL 2K5.

The Village Voice gave the PS2 version a score of eight out of ten and stated that "Taking on generic career-mode opponents can't match fighting friends." BBC Sport gave the game an 80% and said, "The road to the top is a long one and things become repetitive long before you get the chance to glove up against "The Greatest". And training - which is essential to boost your power, stamina and chin - becomes a real chore." Maxim also gave it eight out of ten and said, "Instead of the usual push-button pugilism, throw punches using the analog stick—the direction and speed of the stick determine the swing; the trigger controls handle bobbing, weaving, and blocking." Playboy gave it a score of 75% and said that the game "adds a bit of bob and weave through a control system that allows you to swivel your fighter at the hips."

References

External links 
 

2004 video games
Boxing video games
Xbox games
EA Sports games
NuFX games
PlayStation 2 games
Multiplayer and single-player video games
Video games developed in Canada
Video games developed in the United States